Nicolae Virgil Diaconu (born 4 September 1980) is a Romanian water polo player. At the 2012 Summer Olympics, he competed for the Romania men's national water polo team in the men's event. He is 5 ft 11 inches tall.

References

External links
 

1980 births
Living people
Romanian male water polo players
Olympic water polo players of Romania
Water polo players at the 2012 Summer Olympics